Alexa Ellesse PenaVega (née Vega; born August 27, 1988) is an American actress and singer. She is known for her roles as Carmen Cortez in the Spy Kids film series and Julie Corky in the 2004 film Sleepover. In 2009, she starred as the title character Ruby Gallagher in the ABC Family series Ruby & the Rockits.

Early life
Vega was born in Miami, Florida. She spent some of her childhood years on a ranch in Ocala, Florida.

Her father, Baruch Vega, is a Colombian fashion photographer and student informer for the Central Intelligence Agency,De Cordoba, Jose, 
"Fashion Photographer Scored Millions As an Informant, but Was Justice Served?", The Wall Street Journal, December 7, 2000 and her mother, Gina Rue, is a former model.

Vega has six siblings, including actress Makenzie Vega. She moved with her family to California when she was four years old. As a teenager she was homeschooled.

Career

Acting
In 1996, at the age of 8, Vega starred as young Jo Harding in Twister. She guest-starred in numerous television shows and films, including ER, Follow the Stars Home, Ghost Whisperer, and The Bernie Mac Show. She became known worldwide in 2001 for her role as "Carmen Cortez" in Spy Kids. The first Spy Kids film was a huge success, and two sequels, Spy Kids 2: The Island of Lost Dreams and Spy Kids 3-D: Game Over were filmed. During the shooting of the three films she performed most of her own stunts. In 2011, Vega appeared in the sequel, Spy Kids: All the Time in the World, as a grown Carmen Cortez.

She was named one of the year's hottest teen celebrities in the July 2003 issue Vanity Fair. In 2004, Vega finished filming two films: Sleepover and State's Evidence. The following year, she starred in the Lifetime television film Odd Girl Out, as a victim of cyber-bullying. In 2006, she starred in another made-for-TV movie, Walkout; and finished filming Remember the Daze, which was released in limited theaters in April 2007. She completed filming Repo! The Genetic Opera, which was released in 2008. Vega was confirmed as the lead role in Helix, written and directed by Aram Rappaport, which began filming in Chicago in March 2008. She was originally cast in the 2009 Robert Rodriguez film Shorts, however, due to her being in Australia for the filming of Broken Hill, she had to be recast. She was replaced by Kat Dennings. She appeared on Broadway in Hairspray, as Penny. In 2009, she played Ruby Gallagher on the ABC Family television sitcom Ruby & the Rockits, which also starred Patrick and David Cassidy.

Vega played Wick in the 2012 film The Devil's Carnival, a film from director Darren Lynn Bousman and screenwriter Terrance Zdunich, who previously worked with Vega in Repo! The Genetic Opera.
Throughout 2012, Vega starred in the independent thriller, 2br/1ba, directed by Rob Margolies and co-stars with Spencer Grammer and Kathryn Morris. Vega also starred in the Lifetime Channel movie The Pregnancy Project and her animated film The Clockwork Girl was completed. Vega's film, The Mine, which was filmed in 2010 got a limited release/screening. Vega also voiced Christina in the animated series Unsupervised and had a guest role on Royal Pains. Vega played the young heroine in Aerosmith's music video "Legendary Child".

Throughout 2013 and 2014, Vega appeared in the films 23 Blast, Machete Kills, Bounty Killer, Wicked Blood, The Remaining, and The Hunters. She guest starred on the Big Time Rush series finale "Big Time Dreams", playing herself. In 2015, Vega appeared in Do You Believe? as Lacey.

In 2016, she began starring in a series of Hallmark made for television films, such as Ms. Matched, Destination Wedding, and Christmas Made to Order.

In 2019, Vega and her husband Carlos PenaVega starred in the Hallmark Movies & Mysteries TV movie Picture Perfect Mysteries: Newlywed and Dead, and in 2020 the follow-up Picture Perfect Mysteries: Dead over Diamonds.  She also starred in The Power Couple, a Pure Flix original series.

Dancing
In the fall of 2015, Vega competed on the 21st season of Dancing with the Stars. Her husband, Carlos PenaVega also competed in that season; he and his partner were eliminated in Week 11. Vega was paired with professional dancer Mark Ballas. On November 9, Vega and Ballas were eliminated in Week 9 and finished the competition in 6th place.

Singing

Vega recorded three songs for the soundtracks while playing Carmen Cortez in the Spy Kids films. She released her debut single, "Isle of Dreams" helping to promote the release of the second film; "Game Over" and "Heart Drive" featuring Bobby Edner were released during promotions for the third film.  She recorded songs for the movie Repo! The Genetic Opera which was released in 2008.

Vega sang the song "Christmas is the Time to Say 'I Love You'" in the ABC Family film Santa Baby 2: Christmas Maybe. The track appears on the compilation album Songs to Celebrate 25 Days of Christmas, which was released on November 3, 2009 by Walt Disney Records. The music video for the song premiered during ABC Family's 25 Days of Christmas. She performed several songs for her role on Ruby & The Rockits in 2009. Vega also sang two songs on the soundtrack for the film The Devil's Carnival which was released in 2012.

Personal life
Vega married American film producer Sean Covel on October 10, 2010 in a ceremony held in his hometown of Lead, South Dakota. Robert Rodriguez walked her down the aisle. In July 2012, Vega announced on Twitter that she had divorced Covel.

PenaVega is a Christian and she has said that her faith is the most important thing in her life. Vega was the maid of honor at Nikki Reed's wedding to Paul McDonald.

In late 2012, Vega started dating American actor and singer Carlos Pena Jr., star of Nickelodeon series Big Time Rush and member of pop music boy band by the same name, after meeting him at a Bible study. She guest appeared in the series finale episode of Big Time Rush, aired in July 2013, where she played the on-screen new girlfriend of Pena's character Carlos Garcia. The couple got engaged in August 2013, and were married on January 4, 2014, in Puerto Vallarta, Mexico, both taking PenaVega as their married name. The couple shares a YouTube channel, La Vida PenaVega (formerly LexLovesLos). The couple have three children – two sons born in December 2016 and June 2019, and a daughter born in May 2021.

Filmography

Film

Television

References

External links

 
 

1988 births
20th-century American actresses
21st-century American actresses
Actresses from Miami
American child actresses
American YouTubers
American film actresses
American people of Colombian descent
American television actresses
American voice actresses
American Christians
Hispanic and Latino American actresses
Hollywood Records artists
Living people
21st-century American singers
21st-century American women singers